Hinduism is a major and one of the most-followed religion in Asia, that was more than 25.7% of Asia's total population. In 2020, the total number of Hindus in Asia is more than 1.2 billion. Asia constitute in absolute terms the world's Hindu population and about 99.2% of the world's Hindus live in Asia, with India having the absolute proportion of Hindus having 94% of global Hindu population. Other Asian nations with notable Hinduism population includes, Nepal, Bangladesh, Pakistan, Indonesia, Sri Lanka, Malaysia and United Arab Emirates. Asia is home to the largest Hindu population, mainly in the Indian subcontinent region.

History 

It has thus been called the "oldest religion" in the world.

Hinduism spread in the South and Southeast Asia by the Hindu rulers and dynasties and the reign of Gupta Empire or Gupta era was considered as the "Golden period" for Hinduism and the religion also spread to Central Asia  and Afghanistan through the Silk route. There were also many Hindu colonies in the middle-east Asia with significance of trade with the parts of the world. Though with the Spread of Islam and Muslim conquests in the Indian subcontinent, Afghanistan and Southeast Asia, especially in Indonesia, the Hinduism started declining and shrunk in the Indian subcontinent religion.

Demographics

Central Asia

East Asia

Middle-East

South Asia

Southeast Asia

West Asia

See also 

 Hinduism in Africa
 Hinduism by country
 Religion in India

Notes

References

Citations

Bibliography

External links 
 

 
Religion in Asia